Bailando may refer to:

 "Bailando" (Paradisio song), 1996
 "Bailando" (Enrique Iglesias song), 2014
 "Bailando" (Rouge song), 2018
 Bailando!, special promotional CD release by pop singer Gloria Estefan
 "Bailando", a song by Alaska y los Pegamoides
 "Bailando", a song by Frankie Ruiz
 "Bailando", a song by Lynda Thomas from the album Un grito en el corazón
 "Bailando", a song by Yaga & Mackie from La Moda

See also
 Bailando por un Sueño, a franchised TV series
 "Bailando Por El Mundo", single by Spanish producer, singer, remixer and DJ of electronic music Juan Magan, featuring Pitbull and El Cata
 "Siga Bailando", a song by Bonny Cepeda